Blue Card Services administers the blue card system—Queensland’s Working with Children Check.

The blue card system is used in Queensland, Australia as a prevention and monitoring system for people working with children and young people. Other states in Australia have a similar working with children check, but are not called a "blue card".

Purpose 
All children in Queensland have a right to be safe and protected from harm. The blue card system regulates activities that are essential to children’s lives. These include childcare, education, sport, cultural activities and foster care. We check and monitor people who work in these industries and help organisations to create safe environments for children.

The blue card system is regulated by 2 pieces of legislation: the Working with Children (Risk Management and Screening) Act 2000 (the Act) and the Working with Children (Risk Management and Screening) Regulation 2020.

The blue card system contributes to the creation of safe service environments for children in various ways. Just as each piece of a jigsaw comes together to make a complete picture, the same applies to the blue card system. The different parts all play an essential role in keeping children and young people safe and it works best when all parts work together.

The 4 components of the blue card system involve:

 Who needs a blue card?
 The blue card check.
 Ongoing daily monitoring and compliance with blue card requirements.
 Requirements to develop and implement a child and youth risk management strategy.

References

 www.qld.gov.au/bluecard
 Working with Children (Risk Management and Screening) Act 2000 
 Working with Children (Risk Management and Screening) Regulation 2020.

External links
Official website

Child welfare in Australia